Vuosaari shipyard was a shipyard located in the district of Vuosaari in Helsinki, Finland. Built by the Finnish state-owned company Valmet Oy in the early 1970s, the shipyard delivered 33 newbuildings and participated in building around 100 other vessels before it was closed in 1987 following the bankruptcy of Wärtsilä Marine. Later, the longest dry dock in Finland was used by various ship repair companies until the construction of the new Vuosaari harbour cut the connection to the sea in 2004. Despite various plans to re-use the old dry dock, now located inside the harbour perimeter, it remained without use until the basin was backfilled in 2015–2016.

History 

In 1946 a number of Finnish state-owned heavy industry enterprises were combined to a single conglomerate called Valtion Metallitehtaat (State Metalworks), which acquired several shipyards in Helsinki, Turku and Uusikaupunki. The first ships were oceangoing fishing trawlers built in Suomenlinna for the Soviet Union as part of the Finnish war reparations. In 1950 the company was incorporated and its name was shortened to Valmet Oy, and in the following year a new shipyard was built in Katajanokka in downtown Helsinki. After the war reparations had been paid in full, the future of the state-owned shipyard remained uncertain until the Suez Crisis in 1956, which increased the worldwide demand for new ships and brought new contracts for Valmet as well. Later the company constructed a long series of accommodation ships for the Soviet Union.

However, Valmet was not able to compete with private companies in the newbuilding market, and in 1963 a decision was made to switch focus on repairing existing ships and maintain only limited newbuilding capability on a single shipyard. When demand for new ships increased considerably in the mid-1960s, the shipbuilding strategy of Valmet changed considerably. As the size of new ships was expected to increase in the future, there was a danger that the state-owned shipbuilding company would not be able to compete in the lucrative newbuilding market. Since expanding the shipyard located in the middle of the capital city was deemed impossible, a decision was made to construct a completely new shipyard in Vuosaari.

The Vuosaari shipyard was built in 1971–1974. However, during the construction it was decided to lengthen it to  due to the growing demand of large crude oil tankers, making it the longest dry dock in Finland. Blocks weighing up to 500 tons could be constructed in the production halls and lifted to the construction basin with four 150-ton cranes. When the new shipyard was opened, Valmet also moved its two floating docks of 5,000 and 12,000 tons, used for maintenance and repair docking of smaller vessels, from Katajanokka to Vuosaari. An intermediate gate was built in 1984 so that part of the shipyard could be flooded while the other part was used for docking.

Between 1974 and 1987 Vuosaari shipyard delivered 33 new ships and participated in building around 100 other vessels. These include four 153,000 DWT crude oil tankers for Norwegian shipping company Klaveness in 1977–1979, four large barge carriers, ten SA-15 and SA-15 Super type Arctic cargo ships in 1983–1987, and the first large cruiseferry, Birka Princess for Birka Line, in 1986. The majority of the newbuildings were built for the Soviet Union. The last newbuilding, barge Espa for ESL Shipping, was delivered in 1987.

Vuosaari shipyard was merged with Wärtsilä in 1986 to form Wärtsilä Marine of which Valmet owned 30%. After the downturn in shipbuilding in the mid-1980s, the company decided to close the Vuosaari shipyard on 13 January 1987 and move the shipbuilding to Helsinki Shipyard in Hietalahti. In 1987–1991 various shipping companies rented the old shipyard from Wärtsilä for routine dockings. The cranes were sold in 1991, two to Germany and two to Rauma shipyard. Several ship repair companies operated in and around the old dry dock until 2004, when the construction of the new harbour cut the connection to the sea.

The old shipyard area has since been occupied by other companies. ABB Marine used the old block assembly halls for the construction of Azipods until 2007, Aker Arctic opened a new ice model test facility next to the old dry dock in 2006, and Paulig constructed a modern coffee roasting plant where the main gate of the Vuosaari shipyard once stood. Over the years most of the old buildings, such as the design office close to the dry dock gate, have been demolished. The intermediate gate was also later scrapped and its steel plating re-used in a barge.

While several ideas for re-using the old dry dock were presented over the years, nothing significant was ever realized. In 2008, the floor and walls of the basin were strengthened with concrete and a new wall was built in front of the old steel gate in preparation of using the basin for storage of empty shipping containers, but it was never used for this purpose. In late 2015, the Port of Helsinki began backfilling the dry dock in order to create an above-ground storage area for containers. The work was completed in 2016 and the area has now been paved over.

Ships built in Vuosaari 

Between 1974 and 1987 the following vessels were delivered from the Vuosaari shipyard with the exception of one crude oil tanker that received a yard number but was later cancelled. , less than half of the newbuildings built at Vuosaari remain in service.

Notes

References

Shipyards of Finland
Valmet
Wärtsilä
Vuosaari